François Bunel, a French historical painter, flourished at Blois in 1550. He was a distinguished artist, who painted many religious subjects for churches.

References
 

16th-century French painters
French male painters
French history painters